Horizon was a German progressive metal/power metal band.

History
Horizon was formed in 1998 by drummer Krissy Friedrich and guitarist Patrick Hemer.  After a self-produced debut, they were introduced to Massacre Records by Kosta Zafiriou of Pink Cream 69 and had their first worldwide release, “The Sky’s the Limit”, in 2002, with the help of German producer Achim Kohler. The album, mixing AOR elements with intense riffing and brilliant guitar solos, was critically acclaimed  and was released in Japan through King Records.  The band started then to audition lead singers to allow Patrick Hemer more freedom to dedicate to his guitar playing  and a few names leaked out like that of Chitral Somapala (Firewind, Avalon) and Jakob Samuel (Talisman, The Poodles), but 2004 saw the release of “Worlds Apart” with Patrick Hemer on lead vocals once again. Much heavier than its predecessor, especially due to Hemer's use of a seven-string guitar, “Worlds Apart” was more or less well regarded by some of the European media that had praised “The Sky’s The Limit” but received a warm welcome in Japan (where the famous Burrn! magazine labelled Horizon a “legendary band”) and started to gain the group a cult following. 2005 was supposed to see the band back in the studio to start working on a follow-up to “Worlds Apart”  but this album never saw the light of the day. Although no official break-up has ever been announced, “Worlds Apart” remains the last recording of the band to date. 
Today, Patrick Hemer  seems to be the only former member of Horizon to pursue an active musical career as a studio musician, guitar clinician and solo artist.

Members
Patrick Hemer - guitar, vocals
Bruno J. Frank - bass, background vocals
Vinnie Angelo - keyboards, background vocals (1999–2002)
JP “Giam” Giraldi - keyboards, background vocals (2003–2005)
Krissy Friedrich - drums, background vocals

Albums
Horizon – self-production (1999)
The Sky's the Limit - Massacre Records (2002)
Melody and Power - Massacre Records compilation with Firewind, Silent Force, Edenbridge,... (2003)
Worlds Apart - Massacre Records (2004)

References

 Revolution Music 
 Horizon “Rising Stars” Q&A on Get Ready To Rock! 
 Horizon biography on Spirit Of Metal 
 The Streets webzine : Patrick Hemer interview 
 Power Of Metal : Patrick Hemer interview 
 Lords Of Metal : Krissy Friedrich interview 
 Rock United news 
 Massacre Records Horizon page 
 Rock Hard Magazine (Germany) March 2002
 Burrn! Magazine (Japan)

External links
Patrick Hemer on MySpace 
Patrick Hemer Official Website 

German progressive metal musical groups
German power metal musical groups